The Bermuda national rugby union team represents Bermuda in the sport of rugby union. Bermuda are the current Caribbean Champions 2019 although they have thus far not played in a Rugby World Cup, but have participated in qualifying tournaments.

History
Bermuda first played in qualifying tournaments for a Rugby World Cup in the Americas tournaments for the 1995 Rugby World Cup in South Africa. Bermuda were eliminated from North-Round 1, losing 3 points to 60 to the United States. Bermuda attempted to qualify for the 1999 Rugby World Cup in Wales as well, participating in Group 2 of Round 1 Americas qualifying, where they finished at the top of their pool after defeating both the Bahamas and Barbados, and advancing to Round 2. They defeated Trinidad and Tobago in their first match, but then lost to Chile, and finished second, ending their qualifying run.

Bermuda competes in the Caribbean Championship, a tournament which includes Antigua, Trinidad and Tobago, the Cayman Islands, Jamaica, the Bahamas, British Virgin Islands, and Guyana.

They competed in the North group of the Round 1 of the Americas tournaments in qualifying for the 2003 Rugby World Cup in Australia. They were however knocked out by Trinidad and Tobago and did not advance to Round 2. They drew 10-all against Jamaica in the qualifying tournaments for the 2007 Rugby World Cup in France but did not advance.

They would win the North group in the qualifying tournaments for the 2015 Rugby World Cup and defeat Guyana but in the next round were eliminated in Asuncion by Paraguay.

Record

Overall

Squad
Squad to 2012 NACRA Championship 23 June 2012

Bermuda International Select XV Squad
Squad to face Saracens on May 31, 2013 as part of Saracens tour around Bermuda to promote Caribbean rugby.

Head Coach:  Lewis Moody

Match Day

See also
 Rugby union in Bermuda

References

External links
 Bermuda on rugbydata.com

Rugby union in Bermuda
Caribbean national rugby union teams
National sports teams of Bermuda